The men's 80 kg event in bodybuilding at the 2001 World Games in Akita was played from 18 to 19 August. The bodybuilding competition took place at Akita City Culture Hall.

Competition format
A total of 7 athletes entered the competition.

Results

References

External links
 Results on IWGA website

Bodybuilding at the 2001 World Games